Branislaw Adamavich Tarashkyevich (20 January 1892 – 29 November 1938) was a Belarusian public figure, politician, and linguist.

He was the creator of the first standardization of the modern Belarusian language in the early 20th century. The standard was later Russified by the Soviet authorities. However, the pre-Russified (classical) version of the standard was and still is actively used by intellectuals and the Belarusian diaspora and is informally referred to as Taraškievica, named after Branislaw Tarashkyevich.

Tarashkyevich was a member of the underground Communist Party of Western Belorussia (KPZB) in Poland and was imprisoned for two years (1928–1930). Also, as a member of the Belarusian Deputy Club (Беларускі пасольскі клуб, Byelaruski pasol’ski klub), he was a deputy to the Polish Parliament (Sejm) in 1922–1927. Among others, he translated Pan Tadeusz into Belarusian, and in 1969 a Belarusian-language high school in Bielsk Podlaski was named after him.

In 1933 he was set free due to a Polish–Soviet prisoner release in exchange for Frantsishak Alyakhnovich, a Belarusian journalist and playwright imprisoned in a Gulag, and lived in Soviet exile since then.

He was shot at the Kommunarka shooting ground outside Moscow in 1938 during the  Great Purge and was posthumously rehabilitated in 1957.

Notes

References

External links 
 
 2 pages from original Belarusian grammar by Branislaw Tarashkevich
 

1892 births
1938 deaths
People from Vilnius District Municipality
People from Vilensky Uyezd
Belarusian Socialist Assembly politicians
Communist Party of Western Belorussia politicians
Belarusian Peasants' and Workers' Union politicians
Members of the Rada of the Belarusian Democratic Republic
Members of the Sejm of the Second Polish Republic (1922–1927)
Prisoners and detainees of Poland
Belarusian scientists
Great Purge victims from Belarus